Actinia gigantea is a scientific synonym for two different species of sea anemone. It may refer to:

 Stichodactyla gigantea
 Stichodactyla haddoni